Bojadžiev or Bojadziev (feminine Bojadžieva or Boyadzieva) is a surname of Macedonian origin. Notable people with the surname include:

Duke Bojadziev (born 1972), Macedonian composer, record producer, and pianist
Gjorgji Bojadžiev (born 1950), Macedonian general
Marjan Bojadziev (born 1967), Macedonian economist and banker

See also
Boyadzhiev, Bulgarian surname

Macedonian-language surnames